Naturtheater Grötzingen  is a sylvan theatre in Grötzingen, Baden-Württemberg, Germany. It is a thin concrete shell built in 1954 and seats an audience of 850. It was designed by architect Michael Balz and structural engineer Heinz Isler.

References

Theatres in Baden-Württemberg